Parornix turcmeniella is a moth of the family Gracillariidae. It is known from Turkmenistan.

The larvae feed on Amygdalus scoparia. They mine the leaves of their host plant.

References

Parornix
Moths of Asia
Moths described in 1956